Ratu Tika Bravani or better known as Tika Bravani (born in Denpasar, Bali, Indonesia on February 17, 1990) is an Indonesian model and actress of mixed Bantenese and Minangkabau descent.

Biography

Early life
Ratu Tika Bravani was born in Denpasar, Bali from Bantenese father named Tubagus Zubir Ramadhan and Minangkabau mother named Kemalia Dewi. The Ratu first name is the Bantenese noble title which is pinned to the female descendants of the first sultan of Banten, Maulana Hasanuddin patrilineally derived from the father who has a first name Tubagus as noble title.

Since sixteen years old, Bravani had parted ways with her father because her parents divorced and she chose to live with her mother, Kemalia Dewi. On July 30, 2014, Bravani's mother died at the fourth day of Eid al-Fitr. Dewi has been sick for a year, and was treated for nine months in hospital for cervical cancer. For Bravani, her mother was a great and tough person, and she never complained even if she had problems. Before she died, Dewi told Bravani to get married soon.

Education
Although born in Bali, Bravani spent her childhood in Jakarta. She was a graduate of SMP Labschool Kebayoran in 2005, after which she continued to SMA Negeri 70 Jakarta. Graduated from high school, she continued her studies in Accountancy majors Faculty of Economics, University of Indonesia. In 2013, Bravani successfully completed her studies and earned her bachelor's degree in economics from the University of Indonesia with a GPA of 3.4.

Personal life
On August 7, 2016, Bravani married Dimas Aditya, her co-star on the sitcom program titled Saya Terima Nikahnya on NET TV. Wedding reception held in Cilandak, South Jakarta with a mixture of Minangkabau and Bantenese culture which is packed with a touch of semi-modern and semi-formal shades. Based on the Minangkabau culture that embraced the matrilineal system, Dimas Aditya is given the title of Sutan Marajo of the Bravani family. A few months after marriage, Bravani suffered a miscarriage when she was three weeks pregnant.

Career

Filmography

Film

Sitcom

Soap opera

Television film

 Badik Titipan Ayah (2010) as Andi Tenri
 Carok (2010)
 Adik Bungsu (2011)
 Pahala Terindah (2011)
 Keluarga Kambing (2012)
 Maaf Lebaran ini Kami Tidak Pulang (2012)
 Antologi Hukum-Sengketa Lahan Hati (2013)
 Perempuan Simpanan (2014)
 Gali Lubang, Tutup Lubang, Masuk Lubang (2015)
 Cintaku Kembali Bersemi di Bali (2017) as Maura
 Kecantol Raja Minyak (2017) as Ira
 Prewed Loveaster (2017) as Resi

Awards and nominations

References

Footnotes

External links
  Profile in KapanLagi.com 
 

1990 births
21st-century Indonesian actresses
Indonesian film actresses
People from Denpasar
Indonesian television actresses
Living people